Schools named "Robert Louis Stevenson School" or similar include:
Robert Louis Stevenson School, New York City
Robert Louis Stevenson School, Samoa
Stevenson School, Pebble Beach, California